Jasper Moon (born 24 November 2000) is an English professional footballer who plays as a defender for Burton Albion on loan from Barnsley.

Professional career
A youth product of Leicester City since the age of 8, Moon joined the youth academy of Barnsley in 2017. He briefly joined York City on loan in 2019. Moon made his professional debut with Barnsley in a 2-1 EFL Championship win over Rotherham United F.C. on 29 December 2020.

In January 2023, Moon joined fellow League One club Burton Albion on loan until the end of the season.

Career statistics

References

External links
 

2000 births
Living people
Sportspeople from Coventry
English footballers
Association football defenders
Barnsley F.C. players
York City F.C. players
Burton Albion F.C. players
English Football League players
National League (English football) players